Rheji Burrell is an American dance musician and music producer. With his twin brother Ronald (or Rhano), Burrell was responsible for creating experimental, deep house music in the late 1980s and early 1990s. Much of Burrell's house music output was on the Nu Groove record label, which the brothers founded, often under various aliases, such as 'New York House'n Authority', 'Tech Trax Inc' and 'Utopia Project'.

The brothers had a background in gospel music, and joined the group Inner Spirit as 13-year-olds. They won first place for four consecutive years in the New Jersey Teen Arts Festival, and developed their technical and playing skills on a four-track recorder. The duo earned their first recording deal with Virgin Records in the late 80s. In the early 90s, the Burrells co-founded the Nu Groove record label, responsible for inspiring and launching the careers of several major DJs, re-mixers, and dance music artists.

In the mid 1990s, the Burrell Brothers became successful producers of Hip-Hop, Rap, R&B and Pop music. Today the twins continue recording, and have branched out into film making and "Indie" record releases by working with undiscovered talent.

Rheji Burrell is a voting member of the Recording Academy (Grammy Awards) as well as a RIAA certified Multi-Platinum Songwriter and Producer.

Productions

Discography

Burrell, Burrell (10/Virgin Records 1988)
Tech Trax Inc, Tech Trax Inc
NY House'n Authority, Apartments EP
Utopia Project, Files EP
Jazz Documents, Secret Code
Metro, Angel Of Mercy
Roqui, I've Just Begun To Love You
Rheji Burrell, Space And Time
Rheji Burrell, S.R.O

Producer/writer
JoJo, Blackground (2005) Platinum
Total, Total (1996) Platinum
Monifah, Moods & Moments (1996) Platinum
Channel Live, Station Identification (1995)
Phase Two, "Reachin'" (Rheji Burrell Mix)
Omniscence, "Amazin'" (1996)

References

External links

American house musicians
American hip hop record producers
Year of birth missing (living people)
Living people
Virgin Records artists
American twins